Zakhary Petrovich Lyapunov (? - after 1612) was a Russian political figure of the early 17th century, brother of Prokopy Lyapunov.

Biography 
In 1605, Zakhary Lyapunov took the side of False Dmitri I. Upon the latter's death in 1606, he took part in the Bolotnikov Uprising in 1606–1607. In 1607, he joined the ranks of Vasily Shuisky and became a commander of a unit of the Ryazan dvoryane during the struggle against the rebellious peasants and supporters of False Dmitri II.

In July 1610, Zachary Lyapunov took an active part in deposing Vasily Shuisky. In September 1610, he was included in a diplomatic mission, sent to the outskirts of Smolensk to sign a treaty with the Polish king Sigismund III Vasa regarding the accession of his son Wladislaus to the Russian throne. Then he returned to Moscow and remained in the city until its liberation from the Polish invaders by the army of Kuzma Minin and Dmitry Pozharsky.

Tsardom of Russia people
Zkhary